The Slovenian Chess Championship is the national chess championship held in Slovenia. The championship has been played since the 1950s, first as a regional championship in the Socialist Federal Republic of Yugoslavia, and after the independence of Slovenia as a national championship. Before 1991, the championship was usually played as a qualifier for the Yugoslav Chess Championship in which not always the best players participated. This is because the best Slovenian players were often automatically qualified for the championship based on rating or performance in other tournaments.

Winners

As a regional championship
{| class="sortable wikitable"
! Year !! City (men) !! Men !! City (women) !! Women
|-
|	1936	|| Ljubljana	|| 	||	-	||	-
|-
|	1946	|| Ljubljana	|| 	||	-	||	-
|-
|	1947	|| Kranj	|| 	||	-	||	-
|-
|	1948	|| Celje	||  ||	Ljubljana	||	
|-
|	1949	||	-	||	-	||	Ljubljana	||	
|-
|	1950	||	-	||	-	||	Ljubljana	||	
|-
|	1951	||	Ljubljana	||		||	Ljubljana	||	
|-
|	1952	||	Ljubljana	||		||	-	||	-
|-
|	1953	||	Ljubljana	||	 	||	Ljubljana	||	
|-
|	1954	||	Ljubljana	||	  	||	Ljubljana	||	
|-
|	1955	||	Ljubljana	||		||	Ljubljana	||	
|-
|	1956	||	Ljubljana	||		||	Dobrna	||	
|-
|	1957	||	Laško	||		||	Idrija	||	
|-
|	1958	||	Ljubljana	||		||	Ljubljana	||	
|-
|	1959	||	Ljubljana	||		||	Ljubljana	||	
|-
|	1960	||	Izola	||		||	Murska Sobota	||	
|-
|	1961	||	Ljubljana	||		||	Ljubljana	||	
|-
|	1962	||	Ljubljana	||		||	Dobrna	||	
|-
|	1963	||	Ljubljana	||		||	Ljubljana	||	
|-
|	1964	||	Ljubljana	||		||	Ljubljana	||	
|-
|	1965	||	Ljubljana	||	  	||	Ljubljana	||	
|-
|	1966	||	Ljubljana	||		||	Maribor	||	
|-
|	1967	||	Ljubljana	||		||	Ljubljana	||	
|-
|	1968	||	Ljubljana	||		||	Maribor	||	
|-
|	1969	||	Ljubljana	||		||	Ljubljana	||	
|-
|	1970	||	Ljubljana	||		||	Maribor	||	
|-
|	1971	||	Ljubljana	||		||	Otočec	||	
|-
|	1972	||	Ljubljana	||		||	Dravograd	||	
|-
|	1973	||	Maribor	||		||	Ljubljana	||	
|-
|	1974	||	Šmarješke Toplice	||		||	Radovljica	||	
|-
|	1975	||	Ptuj	||		||	Murska Sobota	||	
|-
|	1976	||	Ljubljana	||		||	Jesenice	||	
|-
|	1977	||	Laško	||		||	Maribor	||	
|-
|	1978	||	Radovljica	||		||	Maribor	||	
|-
|	1979	||	Maribor	||	  	||	Ljubljana	||	
|-
|	1980	||	Trbovlje	||		||	Maribor	||	
|-
|	1981	||	Ljubljana	||		||	Kranj	||	
|-
|	1982	||	Kranj	||		||	Celje	||	
|-
|	1983	||	Maribor	||		||	Kranj	||	
|-
|	1984	||	Radovljica	||		||	Kranj	||	
|-
|	1985	||	Ptuj	||		||	Kranj	||	
|-
|	1986	||	Kranj	||		||	Ptuj	||	
|-
|	1987	||	Zalec	||		||	Maribor	||	
|-
|	1988	||	Vrhnika	||		||	Postojna	||	
|-
|	1989	||	Portorož	||		||	Ljubljana	||	
|-
|	1990	||	Ptuj	||		||	Ljubljana	||	
|}

As a national championship
{| class="sortable wikitable"
! Year !! City (men) !! Men !! City (women) !! Women
|-
|	1991	||	Ljubljana	||		||	Ptuj	||	
|-
|	1992	||	Postojna	||		||	Bled	||	
|-
|	1993	||	Radovljica	||		||	Murska Sobota	||	
|-
|	1994	||	Nova Gorica	||		||	Podlehnik	||	
|-
|	1995	||	Vrhnika	||		||	Ljubljana	||	
|-
|	1996	||	Griže	||		||	Griže	||	
|-
|	1997	||	Krško	||		||Ljubljana||
|-
|	1998	||	Maribor	||		||Maribor||
|-
|	1999	||	Kranj	||		||Kranj||
|-
|	2000	||	Škofja Loka	||		||Škofja Loka||
|-
|	2001	||	Griže	||		||Griže||
|-
|	2002	||	Dobrna	||	 ||Dobrna||
|-
|	2003	||	Bled	||		||Bled||
|-
|	2004	||	Maribor	||		||Maribor||
|-
|	2005	||	Ptuj	||		||Ptuj||
|-
|	2006	||	Ljubljana	||		||Ljubljana||
|-
|	2007	||Ljubljana||	||Ljubljana||
|-
|	2008	||Ljubljana||	||Ljubljana||
|-
|	2009	||	Otočec	||		||Otočec||
|-
|	2010	||Ljubljana||	||Ljubljana||
|-
|	2011	||Ljubljana||	||Ljubljana||
|-
|      2012    ||Ljubljana||  ||Ljubljana||
|-
|      2013    ||Ljubljana||   ||Ljubljana||
|-
|      2014    ||                      ||  ||      Moravske Toplice   || 
|-
|     2015     ||Ptuj|| ||Ljubljana||
|-
|     2016     ||Otočec|| ||Otočec||
|-
|     2017     ||                ||  ||Maribor||
|-
|     2018     ||Ljubljana|| ||Ljubljana||
|-
|     2019     ||   Radenci             ||  ||Radenci||
|-
|     2020     ||   Portorož             ||  ||Portorož||
|-
|     2021     ||   Otočec             ||  ||Otočec||
|}

See also
 Yugoslav Chess Championship

References
 Results and crosstables from the official Slovenian Chess Federation: and 
 Results from TWIC: and 
 Results from FIDE tournament reports: 2012 women, 2013, 2013 women, 2014 women, 2015 women
 Campionati nazionali della Slovenia

Chess national championships
Women's chess national championships
Championship
National championships in Slovenia